Parabagrotis cupidissima is a species of moth in the family Noctuidae (owlet moths). It was described by Augustus Radcliffe Grote in 1875 and is found in North America, where it ranges from southern Vancouver Island, along the Pacific Coast states, to southern California. The habitat consists of grasslands and oak woodlands.

The length of the forewings is 15–18 mm. The forewings are speckled or powdery light brown to orange-brown, with lighter ochreous to orange lines and spots. The hindwings are grey with darker grey toward the margin. Adults are on wing from late May to October in the northern part of its range.

The larvae probably feed on Poaceae species.

The MONA or Hodges number for Parabagrotis cupidissima is 11047.3.

References

Further reading
 Lafontaine, J. Donald, Dominick, R. B. et al., eds. (1998). "Noctuoidea Noctuidae (part) Noctuinae (part - Noctuini)". The Moths of America North of Mexico, fasc. 27.3, 348.
 Lafontaine, J. Donald & Schmidt, B. Christian (2010). "Annotated check list of the Noctuoidea (Insecta, Lepidoptera) of North America north of Mexico". ZooKeys, vol. 40, 1–239.
 Arnett, Ross H. (2000). American Insects: A Handbook of the Insects of America North of Mexico. CRC Press.

External links
Butterflies and Moths of North America
NCBI Taxonomy Browser, Parabagrotis cupidissima

Noctuinae
Moths described in 1875